The 2007–08 Marquette Golden Eagles men's basketball team represented Marquette University in the 2007–08 NCAA Division I men's basketball season. The Golden Eagles, led by ninth-year head coach Tom Crean, played their home games at the Bradley Center as members of the Big East Conference. They beat Kentucky in the opening round of the NCAA tournament, then lost to Stanford.

Roster

Source:

Schedule and results

|-
!colspan=9 style=| Non-conference regular season

|-
!colspan=9 style=|Big East regular season

|-
!colspan=9 style=| Big East tournament

|-
!colspan=9 style=|NCAA tournament

Rankings

References

Marquette Golden Eagles
Marquette Golden Eagles men's basketball seasons
Marquette
Marquette
Marquette